Tina is a former settlement in Summers County, West Virginia, United States. Tina was located northeast of Claypool and appeared on maps as late as 1912.

References

Geography of Summers County, West Virginia
Ghost towns in West Virginia